Loch Fender is a small irregular shaped freshwater loch that lies to the north of Loch Freuchie and three miles south-south-east of Amulree and 2 and a half miles from  southeast from Milton  in Perth and Kinross. For its size it is very deep.

Geography
Loch Fender lies midway between Glen Quaich and Glen Cochill in a bowl formed between two small hills, at the top of Glen Fender.

See also
 List of lochs in Scotland

References

Freshwater lochs of Scotland
Lochs of Perth and Kinross
Tay catchment
Birdwatching sites in Scotland